The North American version of the Ford Escort is a range of cars that was sold by Ford from the 1981 to 2003 model years.  The direct successor of the Ford Pinto, the Escort also largely overtook the role of the European-imported Ford Fiesta as the smallest vehicle in the Ford model line in North America.  Produced across three generations, the first generation was a subcompact; the latter two generations were compact cars.  Becoming highly successful in the marketplace, the Escort became the best-selling car in the United States after 1982, a position it would hold for much of the 1980s.

Produced across three generations, the Escort was the first world car developed by Ford, with the first-generation American Escort designed alongside Ford of Europe, who transitioned the Escort Mk III to front-wheel drive.  During its production, the Escort also underwent a wide use of platform sharing and rebranding.  The first generation served as the basis of the longer-wheelbase Ford Tempo/Mercury Topaz, the two-seat Ford EXP/Mercury LN7 and was rebranded as the Mercury Lynx.  The second generation was introduced for 1991, growing into the compact segment.  Moving away from a shared design with Ford of Europe, the Escort now shared a platform with the Mazda 323 and sharing a body with the Ford Laser (a model line sold in Asia and Oceania); the Mercury Lynx was replaced by the Mercury Tracer.  For 1997, the third generation served as an extensive redesign of the previous-generation sedan; the Escort ZX2 two-door was introduced, with the Mercury Tracer adopting a similar redesign.

Ford introduced the Ford Focus in North America for 2000 as its third "world car", phasing it in as the successor of the Escort.  After 2000, the four-door Escort was moved primarily to fleet sales (with the coupe remaining available); production ended entirely after the 2002 model year.  In contrast to the first-generation American Escort and Escort Mk III of Ford of Europe (and the Mondeo/Contour and Mercury Mystique), the Focus adopted a much larger degree of commonality between its European and North American variants, in effect, becoming the original world car Ford had originally envisaged with the Escort.

During its entire production, the Escort was produced by Wayne Stamping & Assembly in (Wayne, Michigan) and the first generation was also produced by Edison Assembly in (Edison, New Jersey), San Jose Assembly Plant in (Milpitas, California), and Oakville Assembly in (Oakville, Ontario, Canada) while the second and third generations were also produced by Hermosillo Stamping and Assembly in (Hermosillo, Sonora, Mexico).

Ford "world car" 

The North American Ford Escort began as an intended "world car" project by Ford in North America and Ford of Europe, which had sold cars branded "Ford Escort" since 1968.  Ford had already tried to market its European models in the North American market, including the Capri and the Mk I Fiesta, but these were single products conceived from the beginning to cater for both markets, not world cars.

The programme intended to consolidate the replacements for the North American Ford Pinto and the European Ford Escort Mk II under a single model architecture.  Intended for a 1981 model launch, the original intent was for the American Escort and the European Mk III Escort to share a common chassis architecture and components.  During model development, American and European design teams diverged in thinking, leading to extensive differences in the final product lines.

Though they share the same basic shape, the 1981 Ford Escort and Escort Mk III share no interchangeable body parts; the only common components between the two vehicles are the CVH inline-4 engine and the ATX automatic transmission.  The suspension is the same basic design between both cars, but again the components are not interchangeable.  While sharing a common 94.2 inch wheelbase, the American Escort is longer and wider than the European version; most versions are fitted with a larger amount of chrome exterior trim typical of American vehicles of the period, and the altered proportions gave the car a heavier and more ungainly appearance than its European sister. In Europe, the Escort was produced in three body styles never developed for North America, including a 3-door station wagon, 2-door convertible, and a 2-door van.  The European version also had a 4-door sedan derivative marketed separately under the Orion nameplate.

First generation (1981–1990)

The first-generation Ford Escort was launched on October 3, 1980, for the 1981 model year, with Lincoln-Mercury marketing the model line as the Mercury Lynx. Sharing a nearly identical wheelbase with the Pinto, the Escort grew in size over its predecessor, nearly six inches longer and over three inches taller. Alongside an unnamed base trim, the Escort was marketed in L, GL, GLX, and SS trim levels.

1981-1984 

For 1981, the Escort was initially introduced with three-door hatchback and five-door station wagon body styles; a five-door hatchback was introduced in May 1981. To showcase its "world car" status, Ford designed an Escort badge for the front fenders including a globe representing the earth; this badge was used for 1981 only. In line with the larger Fairmont and LTD Crown Victoria station wagons, the Escort wagon was offered with an imitation woodgrain Squire package in the GL and GLX trims.

For 1982, the exterior received a minor revision, as the model badging was revised to reflect the adoption of the Ford Blue Oval emblem on the North American product lines. Along with an updated grille, the blue oval also replaced the previous "FORD" lettering on the liftgate. The "SS" package was also available during 1981; this included blacked-out trim, a special stripe and decal package, upgraded brakes, and wider tires but no additional power. The SS package was replaced with the (more powerful) Escort GT the following year due to an interaction with General Motors' Chevrolet SS option package. The Ford EXP was introduced as a two-seat hatchback coupe (see below).  Starting at a price of $5,518, the 1982 Escort became the best-selling Ford model line and the best-selling automobile nameplate in the United States.

For 1983, the exterior was largely carryover, with most changes concentrated to the Escort GT and the EXP. For liftback/wagon Escorts, the unnamed base model was dropped, leaving the L trim as standard.

For 1984, the trim levels were revised further, as the GLX was dropped and replaced with a fuel-injected LX model. Offered for the five-door hatchback or wagon, the LX was fitted with the fuel-injected engine of the GT, along with its blackout trim and styled cast-aluminum wheels. The interior of the Escort was revised, introducing a new dashboard and new rubber shift boots for manual transmissions; automatic models received new gear selector levers with straight lines for gear selection instead of the twisting "question mark" pattern of the previous models. In line with other Fords, activation of the horn was moved from the turn signal stalk to the steering wheel.

1985–1990

Debuting as a "1985½" model change, Ford released a revision of the first-generation Escort. While much of the bodyshell was carried over, the front fascia saw extensive aerodynamic revisions, with designers fitting a smaller grille and flush-mounted aerodynamic headlamps, and the 1.6 L engine was replaced with a more powerful 1.9 L. Chrome trim was now largely relegated to the bumpers. In a trim revision, the Escort Pony became the lowest-price version of the model line, replacing the Escort L entirely for 1986. The Mazda diesel engine continued to be available in the five-door hatchback versions of the Lynx and Escort until discontinued after 1987.

For 1987, the trim lineup was simplified to a three-version range, including the Pony, GL, and GT. The Pony and GT were offered solely as a three-doors; the GL was offered as a three-door, five-door, and wagon. The model year also saw the retirement of the Mercury Lynx, replaced by the Mercury Tracer during 1987 (a rebranded Ford Laser, itself derived from the Mazda 323). 1987 was also the last year the Escort was built in Canada.

The Escort saw a second facelift in mid-1988, commonly referred to as the "88.5" year, which smoothed out the front and rear fascias. The integrated plastic bumpers replaced the metal bumpers, while the rear side windows were enlarged, and the rear-end design was more rounded. Larger, 14 inch wheels replaced 13 inch units on non-GTs and to accommodate passive-restraint regulations, the Escort received automatic shoulder safety belts. Three-door hatchback models had curving window lines along the sides towards the rear of the cars. The Escort EXP was discontinued and the LX trim replaced the GL, while the Escort Pony replaced the Standard and L versions. Finding some popularity during the final three years of this generation was the Pony model, which was the least-expensive U.S.-built Ford prior to the introduction of the Ford Festiva. Pony models used plainer interior trim with greater use of vinyl and plastic instead of cloth, and four-speed manual transaxles were standard, although buyers could opt for the five-speed manual or the three-speed ATX automatic. The list of available options was very limited, to the extent that such luxuries as power steering and factory-installed air conditioning were not offered (a dealer-installed A/C system was available). Given their lighter weight, the Pony models also had somewhat better fuel economy than the regular Escorts.

The 88.5 Escort remained largely unchanged for the 1989 and 1990 model years. As Ford was gearing up for the April 1990 introduction of the next generation Escort, assembly of this version was restricted to Edison Assembly plant in New Jersey for the abbreviated 1990 model year.

Powertrain details 
Developed for the Escort on both sides of the Atlantic, the CVH inline-four engine family was introduced in a 1.6-litre displacement alone for the North American market; a 1.3 L engine was designed and a prototype made, but did not see production due to lack of power and an inability to get it certified. The launch version of the hemi overhead cam inline-four produces . It was paired with four-speed MTX-2 and five-speed MTX-3 manual transmissions, and a three-speed ATX/FLC automatic transmission.

In March 1982 an HO (high output) version of the engine was added, originally only in the EXP and with an automatic transmission, but soon thereafter available with a manual and also in the sporting Escort GT (which had replaced the SS). This unit produces , thanks to a higher compression ratio, a new exhaust system, and larger venturis in the carburetor. The 1983 GT was the first US Escort to be offered with a 5-speed manual transmission.

For 1984, two new engines were introduced. The turbo engine then found its way into the Escort GT (and Lynx RS) during the 1984 model year.

The GT was available only with manual transmissions, and the Turbo GT was retired. Estimates state that only about 1,000 Turbo GTs were built in the partial 1984 model year, it is unknown how many early 1985s were made.

The model year also saw the retirement of the diesel engine, discontinued due to low demand as American buyers largely gave up on diesel-engined cars during the 1980s (the proportion of diesel sales overall went from a peak of 6.1 percent in 1981 to 0.37 percent in 1986). Less than 1.2 percent of Escort/Lynx overall sales were diesels.

Production Figures

Variants

EXP 

Introduced for 1982, the two-seat Ford EXP (later Escort EXP) was a coupe variant of the Escort.  The first production two-seat Ford since the Thunderbird, the EXP was developed with a sportier exterior appearance (but few performance upgrades) over the standard three-door liftback.  The EXP was sold by Lincoln-Mercury from 1982 to 1983 as the Mercury LN7, differing slightly in grille and hatchback design.

Following the 1985 update of the Escort, the EXP underwent a restyling, becoming the Escort EXP.  Distinguished by the adoption of the front fascia from the liftback Escort, the two-seat coupe adopted a more subdued appearance.  The variant was discontinued after the 1988 model year; as consumer demand shifted away from two-seat vehicles, Ford sought to concentrate its resources on the four-seat Ford Probe (which began development as the intended 1989 Ford Mustang).

Escort GT 

For 1981, Ford introduced the Escort SS as a performance-oriented version of the model line, offered as both a three-door liftback and five-door station wagon. Externally distinguished by blacked-out trim, special stripes and SS decals, the Escort SS also received upgraded brakes, suspension, and model-specific seats and full instrumentation. The drivetrain was unchanged; 6,842 Escort SS were built for the 1981 model year.

As a running change during the 1982 model year, the Escort SS was renamed the Escort GT. In addition to removing conflict with the Chevrolet SS option package, the change aligned the model nomenclature with the namesake Mustang GT (with Ford offering the Escort GT solely as a three-door). Aside from the new HO engine, the GT featured cosmetic changes such as "GT" emblems and stripes, while under the shell there were improved brakes and a close-ratio four-speed gearbox. Also included were metric TR sport alloy wheels with Michelin TRX tires, fog lights, and front and rear spoilers.

For 1984, the Escort GT was largely carryover, with the Turbo GT lasting into the first half of 1985 production.

For the 1985 revision of the Escort, the GT initially went on hiatus, returning for the 1986 model year. Alongside the standard Escort, the 1.6 was replaced by a 1.9-litre fuel-injected engine, with the GT receiving a higher-output  version thereof. Distinguished by its body-color asymmetrical grille, the GT received body-color bumpers (integrating the foglamps), 15-inch alloy wheels, body sill skirts, and optional two-tone paint (similar to the Merkur).

While 1987 was largely carryover, the GT underwent a second facelift midway through the 1988 model year alongside the standard Escort 3-door. The 1988 Escort GT replaced the asymmetrical grille with a body-color insert and new rear spoiler, while power climbed by two horsepower. For 1989, the GT received another grille revision, and stayed unchanged for 1990.

Mercury Lynx  

The first-generation Ford Escort was marketed by Lincoln-Mercury as the Mercury Lynx.  The successor to the Mercury Bobcat, the Lynx also adopted a nameplate derived from big cats.  Sharing its entire body with the Escort, the Lynx differed from its Ford counterpart primarily in its grille styling, parking light and taillamp lenses, and the use of additional chrome trim.  Similar to the Escort, the Lynx was introduced in base, L, GL, GS, LS, and RS trims; the Mercury LN7 was the divisional counterpart of the Ford EXP.

A late addition for the 1983 model year, Mercury introduced the Lynx LTS (Luxury Touring Sedan) in October 1982. The counterpart of the Escort LX, the HO engine equipped LTS was also fitted with blacked-out exterior trim, TRX aluminum wheels, low-back bucket cloth seats, and upgraded suspension, serving as a five-door counterpart of the Lynx RS (Escort GT).

Alongside the Escort, the Lynx underwent a mid-1985 body revision. Distinguished by the addition of the "cascading" Mercury emblem replacing the "big cat" logo (used by the Mercury Cougar), the Lynx received an all-black grille between flush-mounted aerodynamic headlamps. For 1986, the Lynx RS was renamed the XR3 to align it with the Cougar XR7 (and the eventual Topaz XR5).

The Lynx was retired after 1987, but was replaced by the Mazda 323-derived Mercury Tracer model which was sold alongside it for much of the year. The first Mercury sold without a Ford counterpart (in North America) since 1960, the Mexican- and Taiwanese-assembled Tracer shared its body with the Asian-market Ford Laser, sharing much of its chassis architecture with the Mazda 323/Familia, as would the Escort too by 1991.

Second generation (1991–1996) 

In April 1990, Ford released the second-generation Ford Escort as an early introduction for the 1991 model year. Again a "world car" like the previous generation, the model line shifted away from its Ford of Europe origins, adopting a design from Mazda (at the time, 25-percent owned by Ford). Adopting mechanical commonality with the Mazda 323, the Escort became the American-market version of the third-generation Ford Laser (introduced in 1989). In North America, the Mercury Tracer now shared design commonality with the Escort.

In a major design change, a four-door sedan joined the model line for the 1992 model year, sharing its underpinnings with the Mazda Protegé.

Design overview 
The second-generation Ford Escort adopted the Mazda B platform (BG); in North America, the chassis was also used by the Mazda 323/Protegé. Again using front-wheel drive, the wheelbase expanded to 98.4 inches (almost within an inch of the Tempo). To improve handling stability, a rear anti-sway bar was added to the rear suspension. In another design change, the Escort adopted independent rear suspension.

The Escort shared its body with the third-generation Ford Laser, introduced in Japan in 1989. The two model lines are nearly identical in appearance; the standard Escort was styled with a grille insert styled in line with the Ford Taurus and places the rear license plate between the taillamps (the Laser, into the rear bumper). The Escort sedan was styled with a body-color C-pillar, with black trim for the Laser (a design adopted for higher-trim Mercury Tracer sedans). In line with the previous generation, the Escort GT again adopted an asymmetrical grille insert. Unique to North America, the five-door Escort station wagon was styled with vertical taillamps (in line with the larger Taurus); following the discontinuation of the LTD Country Squire, the Escort wagon now served as half of the Ford station wagon line.

Powertrain details 
While the Laser shared powertrain offerings with the Mazda Familia/323, the Escort carried over the 1.9L CVH inline-four (retuned to 88 hp) from the previous generation. For 1991, the engine replaced the previous throttle-body fuel injection with a sequential configuration (SEFI); to allow for a lower hoodline, the engine was tilted forward. The Escort GT dropped the CVH engine, replacing it with the Mazda-sourced 127 hp DOHC BP 1.8L I4 (shared with the Mazda Protegé LX and Mazda MX-5).  The 4-speed manual and 3-speed automatic transmissions were dropped. Both engines were paired with a standard 5-speed manual transmission; a 4-speed automatic was offered with the 1.9L engine as an option.

The 1.9-litre engine was one of the first Ford engines to feature distributorless ignition (known as EDIS, Electronic Distributorless Ignition System). The Ford Escort GT was fitted with four-wheel disc brakes.

Design history 

For 1991, Ford introduced the second-generation Escort under Pony, LX, and GT trims, returning the previous three-door and five-door hatchbacks and five-door station wagon. While growing in wheelbase, the Escort saw only negligible growth in overall size, gaining less than two inches in length and approximately 100 pounds of weight.

For 1992, to improve engine cooling, the grille oval around the Ford emblem was enlarged in size.  In a trim change, the base-trim Pony was dropped for the last trim, becoming an unnamed standard trim Escort. For the first time, a four-door Escort sedan was introduced, with the LX-E trim serving as the Ford counterpart of the Mazda Protegé LX and four-door Escort GT (equipped with four-wheel disc brakes, larger front brakes, larger clutch, equal-length driveshafts, larger anti-roll bars, dual-outlet exhaust, sport interior, and 1.8L DOHC engine).

For 1993, 1.9-litre Escorts moved from 13-inch to 14-inch wheels (last used in 1990); the GT continued its use of 15-inch wheels. For non-wagon LXs, a "Sport Appearance" option package was introduced; along with 14-inch alloy wheels, the option included a decklid spoiler and the full-width taillamps used by the GT.

For 1994, a driver-side airbag was added to the dashboard; dual airbags were made standard for 1995, requiring a redesign of the dashboard, however the motorized seat belts remain on the US-market models.

For 1996, the Escort saw few changes as the third generation was introduced for 1997.

Production Figures

Third generation (1997–2003)

The restyle dropped the hatchbacks and added a new sporty coupe for the 1998 model year.

There are subtle differences in the Escort sedan from 1996 to 2002. The trim lines for 1997 were base and LX, for 1998–2002 it was offered in LX and SE trims. For 1999, the reverse lights were moved into the same piece as the tail lamps; they were previously below the tail lamp on the body.

A very rare trim package was available with chrome  wheel covers and other features. It was offered in 1999.

The Escort was offered in a "Sport" package as well. The Mercury Tracer's version was called the "Trio" or "Sport" depending on the year. A basketweave type of wheel was put on the Tracer Trio while a flower petal pattern was used on the Tracer Sport. The Sport/Trio package included aluminum wheels, a sport exhaust tip, a tachometer, and a rear decklid spoiler.

The Escort wagon largely retained the same body style, gaining only the new interior, front end and fascia, side-view mirrors, door handles, badging, and slightly restyled taillamps and reflectors. The black window frames on the doors of some models became body-colored.

Both the Escort wagon and the Mercury Tracer sedan and wagon were discontinued after 1999. The Escort sedan disappeared from price lists in 2002, but continued to be sold as fleet and rental cars only. The Escort was replaced by the Ford Focus . The last Ford Escort rolled off the assembly line in June 2002. The last ZX2 rolled off the assembly line on March 21, 2003. In Mexico, it was replaced by the smaller Ford Ikon.

Engines
 1997–2002 2.0 L (1986 cc) CVH SPI2000, SOHC I4,  at 5,000 rpm,  at 3,750 rpm, redline 5,500 rpm sedan and wagon
 1998–2003 2.0 L (1989 cc) Zetec, DOHC I4,  at 5,750 rpm,  at 4,250 rpm, redline 6,500 rpm, 7,200 rpm rev limiter ZX2
 1999–2000 2.0 L (1989 cc) Zetec, DOHC I4,  ZX2 S/R

ZX2

The 1998 Escort ZX2 replaced the Ford Probe as Ford's sport compact car. The ZX2 was a much lower-slung and rakish car than both the Escort sedan and wagon, aimed squarely at the youth market as a replacement for the Escort GT (although lacking its rear disc brake setup) and was built exclusively at Ford's Hermosillo, Sonora, Mexico, assembly plant. The interior was refreshed for 1999, and the model was retired after 2003.  It had a completely redesigned dashboard, and included a panel that unified the heat and radio controls, similar to that of the third generation Ford Taurus.

The 1998 Escort ZX2 coupe featured the 2.0 L,  Zetec DOHC four-cylinder engine as standard equipment, an option unavailable on the sedan or wagon. Intended for use as the base engine in the larger European Ford Mondeo and its American cousins, the Ford Contour and Mercury Mystique, the Zetec gave the ZX2 respectable performance, running 0–60 mph in 7.4 seconds.

The 1999 and 2000 models offered a performance limited edition ZX2 S/R which further enhanced the car's performance.

For 2001, the four-door sedan was limited to fleet sales only and the Escort moniker on the Escort ZX2 was quietly dropped, making the car officially just a two-door notchback coupe.

The Ford Focus debuted in 1998 (1999 in the U.S.) and was produced concurrently with the ZX2. Despite some popularity, the ZX2 was replaced by the Focus ZX3, ZX4 and ZX5. Though the two cars share the same Zetec engine, there are a few differences. The Focus lacks the exhaust-side VCT, and contains less aggressive camshafts that push the power band down a few hundred RPM. Due to better gearing and less weight, the ZX2 continued to outperform the Focus. The ZX2 continued with little more than  alloy wheels and a rear defroster newly offered as standard equipment, and for 2003, a revised front fascia. Production ceased at the end of the 2003 model year.

ZX2 S/R
The increased presence and success of tuner models from overseas in the late 1990s caused Ford to create their own performance model, the ZX2 S/R, meant to compete with factory performance sport compacts such as the Honda Civic Si and the Dodge Neon ACR. Its initial debut was at SEMA's Import Auto Salon in Pomona in 1999. The ZX2 S/R was the first product jointly developed by Ford Racing and Ford Motor Company's Small Vehicle Center Product Development.

Ford's final limited production count was 2,110 units, consisting of 110 yellow S/Rs for 1999, the first two of which were sold in Columbus, Ohio, and the other 108 in California; and for 2000, 500 black, 500 red and 1,000 yellow S/Rs were sold. The upgrade price to the S/R package was $1,500 in both years. It is believed that only 35 of 2000 S/Rs were sold in Canada.

All ZX2 S/Rs have a special "S/R" badge on the back, either silver (on a red car) or red (on a yellow or black car). Some S/Rs went out of the assembly plant without some of the performance mods. The suspension bushings were not installed at the factory but instead packaged with the car for installation at the dealership. This also led to many cars leaving the showroom without the full complement of S/R parts.

Sales

References

External links

 Ward's article on Escort development
 Edmunds most significant car of 1981
 ZX2 S/R Takes Fun to Higher Level
 ZX2 Motorsports
 
 TeamZX2
 "Ford Escort may return as 100mpg hybrid"

Escort
Station wagons
Front-wheel-drive vehicles
Compact cars

1990s cars
2000s cars
Hatchbacks
Sedans
Coupés
Cars introduced in 1980
Motor vehicles manufactured in the United States
Cars discontinued in 2003